Jonathan Mostow (born November 28, 1961) is an American film director, screenwriter, and producer. He has directed films such as Breakdown, U-571, Terminator 3: Rise of the Machines, and Surrogates.

Early life
Mostow was born in Woodbridge, Connecticut. His father George Daniel Mostow was a mathematician, and his mother is a social worker. He graduated from Harvard University. He also trained at the American Repertory Company and the Lee Strasberg Institute. He grew up in a Conservative Jewish household.

Career
In 1989, Mostow directed a direct-to-video horror comedy, Beverly Hills Bodysnatchers.

He was originally attached to direct The Game (1997), with Kyle MacLachlan and Bridget Fonda for the lead roles. However, he ended up being an executive producer of the David Fincher-directed film. In 1997, he directed Breakdown, a thriller film starring Kurt Russell. Around the same time, he signed a deal with Universal Pictures. Both Mostow and Lieberman received a TV deal, via his Mostow/Lieberman Productions company to Studios USA.

In 2000, Mostow directed a World War II-era submarine film, U-571. He assembled a cast including Matthew McConaughey, Bill Paxton, Harvey Keitel, TC Carson, and Jon Bon Jovi. The film topped the U.S. box office chart.

In 2003, he directed the third installment of The Terminator film series, Terminator 3: Rise of the Machines, which starred Arnold Schwarzenegger.

Mostow co-wrote a comic book series, The Megas, with John Harrison. Illustrated by Peter Rubin, it was published on Virgin Comics in 2008.

He returned to direct another film, Surrogates, in 2009. Based on the comic book series, it starred Bruce Willis.

In 2017, he directed The Hunter's Prayer, an action thriller film starring Sam Worthington.

Personal life
On October 7, 2018, Mostow married writer Laurie Sandell. The two met through JDate in 2014.

Filmography

Film

Executive producer
 The Game (1997)
 Hancock (2008)
 The Hunter's Prayer (2017)

Television

TV movies

References

External links
 

Living people
1961 births
20th-century American Jews
Harvard University alumni
People from Woodbridge, Connecticut
Film directors from Connecticut
Science fiction film directors
21st-century American Jews